Bald Mountain Ski Area is a small ski area in north central Idaho, located  northwest of Pierce in Clearwater County.  The area first opened  in January 1960, with a cotton rope tow powered by a gasoline engine. Originally for employees of the Potlatch Corporation (forest products) in the village of Headquarters, it opened to the public in the 1960s.

The north-facing slopes are served by two surface lifts: a T-bar and a rope tow, and the main lodge and parking area are at mid-mountain. The T-bar made its debut in late January 1969, and the A-frame lodge was built in 1971.

This ski area is independent of the much larger Bald Mountain, the primary ski mountain at Sun Valley, a major ski resort in southern Idaho's Blaine County.

References

External links

Ski Idaho – Bald Mountain ski area
Sangres.com – Bald Mountain ski area
Ski Map.org – trail maps – Bald Mountain ski area
Visit Idaho – Bald Mountain Ski Area
Northwest Passage Scenic Byway – Bald Mountain Ski Area

Ski areas and resorts in Idaho
Buildings and structures in Clearwater County, Idaho
Tourist attractions in Clearwater County, Idaho
1960 establishments in Idaho